Irving Petlin (December 17, 1934 – September 1, 2018) was an American artist and painter renowned for his mastery of the pastel medium and collaborations with other artists (including Mark di Suvero and Leon Golub) and for his work in the "series form" in which he employed the raw materials of pastel, oil paint and unprimed linen, and found inspiration in the work of writers and poets including Primo Levi, Bruno Schulz, Paul Celan, Michael Palmer and Edmond Jabès.

Petlin attended the Art Institute of Chicago from 1953-1956 where he received his BFA during the height of the Chicago Imagist movement. At a critical juncture Petlin attended Yale to study under Josef Albers, subsequently earning his MFA in 1960. In 1964, his work was shown at the Hanover Gallery in London and Galerie du Dragon in Paris, where he influenced the  movement. That same year, Petlin was invited to teach at UCLA as a visiting artist, along with artists Richard Diebenkorn and Llyn Foulkes.

While in California, he was a principal organizer of the "Artist’s Protest movement against the war in Vietnam."  In open meetings held at the Dwan Gallery, of which John Weber was the director, he founded the Artists’ Protest Committee. In 1966, Petlin planned the Peace Tower with help of Mark di Suvero, as well as Philip Lieder, Craig Kauffman, Larry Bell, Walter Hopps, Rolf Nelson, Judy Chicago, Lloyd Hamrol, Hardy Hanson, Eric Orr, Tanya Nuefeld, and others. "The Artists’ Call" for the tower is published in four languages, and works arrive from all over the world to be attached to it. The finished tower, was dedicated by Susan Sontag and ultimately attacked overnight. The following year, in 1965, Petlin had his first major one-man exhibition held at the Palais des Beaux Arts in Brussels. Shortly thereafter, he returned to New York City with his family and moved into an apartment on West 11th Street. At this time, his growing commitment to the American milieu resulted in the completion of the painting The Burning of Los Angeles. During this period, Petlin 
Was a founder and a participant in Artists and Writers Against the War in Vietnam.  He also toom part in the Art Workers Coalition, the Art Strike, the Moratorium and the Venice Biennale.

The Burning of Los Angeles (1965–1967)

(Collection of the Fine Arts Museums of San Francisco)

From the 1960s, when he became one of the founding members of "Artists and Writers Against the War in Vietnam," Petlin was a leader in political activism by visual artists. He created the iconic anti-Vietnam War poster And babies in 1969. Petlin  continued his militant interventions after the 1960s through such activities as his participation in the "Artists' Call Against the U.S. Intervention in Central America". Petlin taught at the University of California, Los Angeles, the Cooper Union in New York, as well as the Pennsylvania Academy of the Fine Arts in Philadelphia. He lived in Paris, New York and Martha's Vineyard, Massachusetts.

Petlin died of liver cancer in Martha's Vineyard, Massachusetts on September 1, 2018 at the age of 83.

Selected exhibitions

 2014    "The Still Open Case of Irving Petlin".  Kent Fine Art, New York
 2014    "Paris Show": Galerie Jacques Leegenhoek
 2012   Irving Petlin: Storms: After Redon. Kent Fine Art, New York
 2010   Irving Petlin: Major Paintings, 1979-2009. Kent Gallery, New York
 2007   Orpheus, Pastels. Galerie Ditesheim, FIAC, Paris
 2006   Este Mundo. Kent Gallery, New York
 2002   Irving Petlin. Galerie Krugier-Ditesheim Art Contemporain, Geneva, Switzerland
 2001   Out of the Shadows. School of the Museum of Fine Art, Boston
 1998   A Tribute to Meyer Schapiro. Jan Krugier Gallery, New York
 1997   Le Monde D’Edmond Jabes, Pastels. Krugier-Ditesheim Art Contemporain, Geneva
 1996   Paris is White. Kent Gallery, New York
 1995   Irving Petlin: 1955-1995, Disegni nacosti. Studio d’ Arte Recalcati, Turin, Italy
 1993   Swiat Brunona Shulza. Galerie Kordegarda, Varsovie, Poland
 1992    Memories Drawn from Bruno Schulz and Others. Kent Gallery, New York
 1990   Israel in Egypt. Kent Fine Art, New York
 1990   The Periodic Table. Gallery 400, University of Chicago, IL
 1990   Chagall to Kitaj: Jewish Experience in 20th Century Art. Barbican Art Gallery London, England
 1989   A Different War: Vietnam in Art. Whatcom Museum, Bellingham, WA. Curated by Lucy Lippard.
 1988   Pastels 1961-1987. Kent Fine Art, New York, NY

 1987   Weisswald. Kent Fine Art, New York
 1982   Irving Petlin: Recent Paintings and Pastels. Marlborough Fine Art, London, UK
 1982   The Venice Biennale, Italian Pavilion, Venice, Italy
 1981   Drawings from the Studio, 1972-1981. University of California at Santa Cruz
 1980   Irving Petlin, Pastels. Galerie Nina Dausset, Paris
 1978   Rubbings (Large Paintings, Small Pastels). Neuberger Museum-SUNY, Purchase, NY & Arts Club of Chicago, Chicago, Il
 1977   Galleria Bergamini, Milan, Italy
 1974   Documenta, Torino, Italy
 1973   Biennial Exhibition of Contemporary American Art, Whitney Museum New York, NY
 1972   Galleria Bergamini, Milan, Italy
 1968   Irving Petlin: Opere recent. Galleria Il Fante Di Spade, Rome, Italy
 1967   Odyssia Gallery, New York
 1966   Rolf Nelson Gallery, Los Angeles
 1965   Petlin Palais des Beaux-Arts, Brussels, Belgium
 1964   American Show, Art Institute of Chicago, Chicago, IL
 1963   Petlin: Peintures 1962-1963. Galerie du Dragon, Paris, France
 1961   Paris Biennal, American Section. Paris, France
 1960   Petlin, Galerie du Dragon, Paris, France
 1958   Dilexi Gallery, San Francisco, CA
 1956   Cliffdweller Gallery, Chicago, IL
 1954 Exhibition Momentum. Chicago, IL
 1953-56 Art Institute, Chicago, IL

References

External links
NY Times obituary
Petlin sites and artist pages
Irving Petlin Artist Page
Irving Petlin: A Retrospective Artist Page at Jan Krugier Gallery website
Irving Petlin on artnet

Others on Petlin, including reviews & perspectives

"Irving Petlin: The Committed Brushstroke by Peter Selz.
Irving Petlin, Este Mundo by Carrie Moyer at The Brooklyn Rail
from Nomadics Blog: 3 Irving Petlin Shows in New York poet Pierre Joris provides links and commentary on his blog to the 3 major Petlin shows that occurred in New York City in early 2010
Press: Three essays on Petlin link provides access to free PDF online versions of seminal Petlin retrospectives by Edward Fry (from the Wiesswald exhibition catalogue), Paul Cummings ("The Precincts of Light"), and Michael Palmer ("A Bonfire in the Starry Night")
The Unbearable Yet Obligatory, And other shows of modern and contemporary works
Studio Matters, Arts & Commentary: Irving Petlin’s paintings; Bernardo Siciliano’s girlie pix; a Leonardo da Vinci for Times Square by Maureen Mullarkey

Petlin in his own words
Kent Gallery Exhibition Catalogue of Major Paintings, 1979-2009  Click here for free PDF online publication of 90 pages that documented in full those works included in the Kent Gallery exhibition from 2010, including Petlin's own commentaries and complete biographical information on the artist
1000 words: Peace Tower; Irving Petlin, Mark di Suvero, and Rirkrit Tiravanija revisit The Artists' Tower of Protest, 1966 includes extensive transcript of Petlin in his own words
 Petlin discusses some of his work as he walks around the Kent Gallery in 2010
In Conversation: Irving Petlin with John Yau renowned poet/art critic & Art Editor for The Brooklyn Rail John Yau interviews Petlin in 2006

1934 births
2018 deaths
20th-century American painters
American male painters
21st-century American painters
21st-century American male artists
Artists from Chicago
Yale University alumni
Artists from Paris
People from Martha's Vineyard, Massachusetts
School of the Art Institute of Chicago alumni
Academic staff of the University of Haifa
Dartmouth College faculty
Painters from New York City
20th-century American male artists